Yekaterina Mikhaylova (born 28 August 1973) is a Russian short track speed skater. She competed in the women's 3000 metre relay event at the 1994 Winter Olympics.

References

1973 births
Living people
Russian female short track speed skaters
Olympic short track speed skaters of Russia
Short track speed skaters at the 1994 Winter Olympics
Place of birth missing (living people)
20th-century Russian women